The 1992–93 Tennessee State Tigers basketball team represented Tennessee State University as a member of the Ohio Valley Conference during the 1992–93 NCAA Division I men's basketball season. The Tigers, led by second-year head coach Frankie Allen, played their home games at the Gentry Complex in Nashville, Tennessee as members of the Ohio Valley Conference. After finishing atop the OVC regular season standings, the Tigers backed up that success by winning the OVC tournament to receive the conference's automatic bid to the NCAA tournament – the first in school history. Playing as No. 15 seed in the Southeast region, Tennessee State was beaten by Seton Hall, 81–59.

Roster

Schedule and results

|-
!colspan=12 style=| Non-conference regular season

|-
!colspan=12 style=| OVC regular season

|-
!colspan=9 style=| Ohio Valley tournament

|-
!colspan=9 style=| NCAA tournament

Sources

References

Tennessee State Tigers basketball seasons
Tennessee State Tigers
Tennessee State Tigers basketball
Tennessee State Tigers basketball
Tennessee State